Doskie is an unincorporated community located on Mississippi Highway 365 in Tishomingo County, Mississippi, United States.

References

Unincorporated communities in Tishomingo County, Mississippi
Unincorporated communities in Mississippi